Renfrewshire is one of the 32 council areas of Scotland.

The council area has the same name as the historic county of Renfrewshire, which had been abolished for local government purposes in 1975, but the modern council area only covers the central part of the historic county. The eastern part of the pre-1975 county is covered by the East Renfrewshire council area, and the western part by the Inverclyde council area.

Renfrewshire is located in the west central Lowlands. It borders East Renfrewshire, Glasgow, Inverclyde, North Ayrshire and West Dunbartonshire, and lies on the southern bank of the River Clyde. The current council area of Renfrewshire was established in 1996.

The term Renfrewshire may also be used to refer to the larger historic county, which was established in the fifteenth century. The three council areas of Renfrewshire, Inverclyde, and East Renfrewshire together form the Renfrewshire lieutenancy area. The same area also has a joint valuation board area for electoral registration and local tax valuation purposes. The three council areas together are sometimes referred to as Greater Renfrewshire to distinguish them from the council area called Renfrewshire.

The town of Paisley is the area's main settlement and centre of local government. The area also contains the historic county town of Renfrew.

Toponymy
The name Renfrewshire derives from being the shire (the area controlled by a sheriff) administered from the royal burgh of Renfrew. The name Renfrew has been attested since the Roman occupation of Britain. The name is believed to originate from Common Brittonic/Cumbric, from ren, as in Scottish Gaelic: rinn, or as in Welsh: rhyn (a point or cape of land) and from frew, as in Welsh: fraw, or ffrau (flow of water). This suggests a point of land near the flow of water, such as at the confluence of the Cart and Clyde rivers.

History

The historic county of Renfrewshire was abolished for local government purposes in 1975. The county was divided to become three of the nineteen districts in the Strathclyde region, being Eastwood, Inverclyde, and Renfrew.

In the debates leading to the local government reforms of the Local Government etc. (Scotland) Act 1994, the government initially proposed replacing these three districts with two council areas: "West Renfrewshire", covering Inverclyde district and the western parts of Renfrew district (including Paisley, Johnstone, and Renfrew), and "East Renfrewshire", covering Eastwood district and the eastern parts of Renfrew district (including Barrhead, Neilston and Ralston). The proposals were criticised, with West Renfrewshire having three times the population of East Renfrewshire; the accusation was made in parliament that the proposed changes constituted gerrymandering, with East Renfrewshire only being kept separate because it had more Conservative voters.

The proposals were not supported locally, with Inverclyde successfully campaigning to be allowed to form its own council area, and the Ralston area voting in a referendum not to be transferred to East Renfrewshire. When the government conceded to allow Inverclyde to continue as a separate authority, the name West Renfrewshire was dropped. The central district was instead named Renfrewshire, despite only covering the central part of the historic county of that name. The new Renfrewshire covered the former Renfrew district except for the Barrhead electoral division (which also included Neilston) which went instead to East Renfrewshire. The new council areas came into effect on 1 April 1996.

The Braehead shopping centre was built in 1999 straddling the boundary between Renfrewshire and Glasgow, leading to a dispute between the two councils. It was agreed that the boundary should be changed to place the whole centre in one council area, but both authorities wanted it. In 2002, the Local Government Boundary Commission eventually redrew the boundary to include all of the centre in Renfrewshire.

Communities
The area is divided into 25 community council areas, 20 of which have community councils as at 2023 (being those with asterisks in the list below):

Bishopton*
Bridge of Weir*
Brookfield*
Charleston
Elderslie*
Erskine*
Ferguslie*
Foxbar and Brediland
Gallowhill
Glenburn
Hawkhead and Lochfield*
Houston*
Howwood*
Hunterhill
Inchinnan*
Johnstone*
Kilbarchan*
Langbank*
Linwood*
Lochwinnoch*
Paisley East and Whitehaugh*
Paisley North*
Paisley West and Central*
Ralston*
Renfrew*

Culture

Renfrewshire contains several places of interest. In the west of Renfrewshire, Castle Semple Loch at Lochwinnoch and the wider Clyde Muirshiel Regional Park are natural areas of interest, as is the Gleniffer Braes country park in the south.

Paisley contains several historic buildings and notable sites, including Paisley Abbey, Paisley Museum and Coats Observatory, Paisley Town Hall, Coats Memorial Church, Sma' Shot Cottages and St Mirren Park (home of St Mirren F.C.). Outside of Paisley, Elderslie, the claimed birthplace of Scottish knight William Wallace, contains a monument in his honour, while the Weaver's Cottage at Kilbarchan is in the care of the National Trust for Scotland. The town of Johnstone is notable for Johnstone Castle, Johnstone High Parish Church and for containing a museum within a supermarket.

The Braehead Arena in Renfrewshire close to the boundary with Glasgow is home to leading professional basketball team, the Scottish Rocks, who compete in the British Basketball League. The arena was also host to the 2000 Ford World Curling Championships.

Governance

Renfrewshire Council is the elected local authority for Renfrewshire. Its consists of 43 directly elected councillors who elect from among their number a provost to serve as the council's convener and ceremonial head and a leader of the council who is typically the head of the largest political group. The council meets collectively as a full council and carries out a number of functions. Its Scheme of Delegated Functions sets out where the council has agreed to allow powers to be exercised by a committee (referred to as a "board" in Renfrewshire Council), a sub-committee, an officer of the council or a joint committee with one or more other councils. The council continues to reserve a number of functions that can only be carried out by the council acting as a whole. The council's staff is headed by a chief executive who is responsible to the elected council.

Renfrewshire Council acts as the lead authority for Scotland Excel, a collaborative procurement vehicle established in 2008 to support the local authorities of Scotland.

Political control
The first election to Renfrewshire Council was held in 1995, initially operating as a shadow authority alongside the outgoing authorities until the new system came into force on 1 April 1996. Political control of the council since 1996 has been as follows:

Leadership
The leaders of the council since 1996 have been:

Council composition

The most recent election was held in May 2022, following which an SNP led council was formed with the support on confidence and supply from Johnstone North, Kilbarchan, Howwood and Lochwinnoch independent councillor Andy Doig. As of November 2022 the full composition of the council is as follows:

† In November 2022, Paisley Southeast Labour councillor and former Labour Group Leader, Eddie Devine, and John Hood both left the party and now sit as independents.

Premises
The council is based at Renfrewshire House on Cotton Street in Paisley, which was completed between 1969 and 1973 as the "County and Municipal Buildings", being a joint facility for the old Renfrewshire County Council and Paisley Town Council. After the reforms of 1975 the building was shared between Renfrew District Council and Strathclyde Regional Council. Following the creation of Renfrewshire Council in 1996 the building was renamed Renfrewshire House.

Elections
Since 2007 elections have been held every five years under the single transferable vote system, introduced by the Local Governance (Scotland) Act 2004. Election results since 1995 have been as follows:

Electoral wards

 
For the purposes of elections to Renfrewshire Council, the Renfrewshire area is divided geographically into a number of wards which then elect either three or four councillors each by the single transferable vote system. The electoral system of local councils in Scotland is governed by the Local Governance (Scotland) Act 2004, which first introduced proportional representation to councils in Scotland.

These electoral wards, following a 2017 review and first used in the 2017 Renfrewshire Council election are as follows:

Wider politics

UK Parliament
The two parliamentary constituencies covering Renfrewshire are Paisley and Renfrewshire North and Paisley and Renfrewshire South, being represented by Gavin Newlands and Mhairi Black respectively. Created in 2005, both seats and their predecessor constituencies had traditionally been safe seats for the Labour Party, until the Scottish National Party gained them with swings of over 26% in the SNP landslide at the 2015 general election. Although both constituencies were only marginally held by the party over Labour at the 2017 snap election, they returned to safe SNP majorities in the 2019 general election.

|-
! rowspan="2" colspan="2" style="text-align:left;" | Party
! colspan="5"|Votes cast
! colspan="5"|%
! colspan="5"|Seats
|-
!2005
!2010
!2015
!2017
!2019
!2005
!2010
!2015
!2017
!2019
!2005
!2010
!2015
!2017
!2019
|-
| style="background:;"|
| style="text-align:left;" |Scottish National
| 14,349
| 15,621
| 49,149
| 34,419
| 44,990
| 18.2
| 18.6
| 50.8
| 39.0
| 48.5
| 0
| 0
| 2
| 2
| 2
|-
| style="background:#dc241f;"|
| style="text-align:left;" | Labour
| 38,601
| 47,455
| 34,389
| 29,265
| 22,409
| 49.0
| 56.7
| 35.6
| 33.1
| 24.2
| 2
| 2
| 0
| 0
| 0
|-
| style="background:#0087dc;"|
| style="text-align:left;" | Conservative
| 8,754
| 10,360
| 9,709
| 20,964
| 18,788
| 11.1
| 12.4
| 10.0
| 23.7
| 20.3
| 0
| 0
| 0
| 0
| 0
|-
| style="background:#fdbb30;"|
| style="text-align:left;" | Liberal Democrat
| 14,136
| 8,409
| 2,065
| 2,803
| 6,579
| 18.0
| 10.0
| 2.1
| 3.2
| 7.1
| 0
| 0
| 0
| 0
| 0
|-
| style="background:#e9e9e9;"|
| style="text-align:left;" | Others
| 2,905
| 1,920
| 1,376
| 876
| N/A
| 3.7
| 2.3
| 1.4
| 1.0
| N/A
| 0
| 0
| 0
| 0
| N/A
|-
! colspan="2" style="text-align:left;" |Margin
!24,252
!31,834
!14,760
!5,154
!22,581
!30.8
!38.1
!15.2
!5.9
!24.3
! 2
! 2
! 2
! 2
! 2
|-
! colspan="2" style="text-align:left;" | Total
! 78,745
! 83,765
! 96,688
! 88,327
! 92,766
! 100%
! 100%
! 100%
! 100%
! 100%
! 2
! 2
! 2
! 2
! 2
|}

Scottish Parliament
Following the establishment of the Scottish Parliament in 1999, the Labour Party held the three seats covering Renfrewshire, although with lower majorities than their House of Commons equivalents.

Constituency boundaries were redrawn for the 2011 Scottish Parliament election, with the new constituencies of Renfrewshire North and West and Paisley being gained by Derek Mackay and George Adam, who became the first SNP parliamentarians in Renfrewshire. The remaining Labour seat, Renfrewshire South, was gained by the SNP's Tom Arthur at the 2016 Scottish election. Arthur and Adam were re-elected in 2021 winning over half the vote in their respective seats, while Mackay was replaced by Renfrewshire Councillor Natalie Don.

Referendum results
A majority of Renfrewshire rejected independence in the 2014 Scottish independence referendum, although with 55,466 (47.2%) votes cast in favour and 62,067 (52.8%) against, the Yes vote was higher than the national result. The turnout was 117,612 or 87.3%, the highest recorded in the democratic era.

With a turnout of 69.2% (88,197), Renfrewshire voted to remain in the 2016 European Union membership referendum with 64.8% (57,119) of votes cast in favour of remaining while 35.2% (31,010) were for leaving. This was the sixth highest vote for Remain out of Scotland's 32 councils.

Education

Renfrewshire contains the University of the West of Scotland, a new university that was granted university status in 1992 as the University of Paisley. Prior to this, the Paisley Technical College and School of Art was a Central Institution or polytechnic. In 2007 the university merged with Bell College, a further education college in Hamilton, South Lanarkshire and the UWS name was adopted. The university today has sites across the west of Scotland, notably also in Ayr and a joint campus in Dumfries; the main campus remains in Paisley.

Further education is provided by Paisley Campus of West College Scotland in Paisley, which caters to around 20,000 students. The college also has sites in Inverclyde and West Dumbartonshire.

Renfrewshire contains eleven state secondary schools, 51 primary schools and three schools for children with additional support needs.

Transport

Renfrewshire is home to Scotland's second busiest airport, Glasgow International Airport, at Abbotsinch between Paisley and Renfrew. The presence of the airport and the proximity to Glasgow means that Renfrewshire supports one of the busiest transport infrastructures in Scotland.

The airport is served by the M8 motorway, which terminates in the area, just east of Langbank, and is a major artery between northwest and southwest Scotland, via the Erskine Bridge.

Developments to ease traffic flow have included a lifting of tolls on the Erskine Bridge, plans to extend the rail network to connect to the airport, and the M74 extension – which will handle traffic from Renfrewshire heading south, diverting it away from Glasgow city centre. Renfrewshire also has bus links provided by FirstGroup, McGill's Bus Services and other smaller operators.

References

External links

 Renfrewshire Events Guide
 Paisley Daily Express local daily newspaper
 The Gazette Newspaper weekly
 Renfrewshire24.co.uk, online only news and events website

 
Districts of Scotland
Council areas of Scotland